A list of films produced in the United Kingdom in 1988 (see 1988 in film):

1988

See also
1988 in British music
1988 in British radio
1988 in British television
1988 in the United Kingdom

References

External links

1988
Films
British